The Casa del Obrero Mundial or COM was a libertarian socialist and anarcho-syndicalist worker's organization located in the popular Tepito Barrio of Mexico City, founded on September 22, 1912. One of its founders was Antonio Díaz Soto y Gama, one of the founders of the Liberal Party of Mexico (PLM). COM served as a cultural institution promoting worker's education and social transformation through a rationalist, socialist orientation, and as the headquarters for a number of syndicates and unions on a mutual aid basis.

Formation and the revolution 
The Casa del Obrero Mundial was founded in the capital in July 1912, during the presidency of Francisco I. Madero; its founders included Antonio Díaz Soto y Gama, Manuel Sarabia, and Lázaro Gutiérrez.

The Casa del Obrero Mundial was at the center of the Mexican labor movement in the early 20th century, and was nourished in part by Spanish anarchosyndicalist exiles of the Confederación Nacional del Trabajo. At the time, the Mexican labor movement was relatively advanced, and though it was not a predominantly industrial economy its non-peasant workers were fairly conscious of popular struggle and their weight in society. It was founded in the general uprising of the Mexican Revolution after the long, heavy-handed repression of labor under the Porfiriato.

The COM sought abolition of the capitalism and the coordination of worker's syndicates into a confederated socialist economy. In order to do this it engaged in many strikes that struck Mexico before and during the revolution, aiming for its preferred goal of general strike. In a heavily agriculture-based economy, however, its alliance with Mexican campesinos was crucial to its success, but in this aspect it failed, and, through the convoluted situation of the revolution, allied itself with Carranzista forces and formed Red Battalions to fight its supposedly counter-revolutionary enemies, namely the rural-based Zapatistas. The House went into decline following Carranza's increasing suppression of strikes, ultimately pushed out of the labor opposition by labor unions more under government control, such as the CROM. Following the suppression of a general strike on 31 July 1916, the COM was banned on 2 August, with arrest warrants being issued for its leaders. Its regional offices and armories were also seized, and Carranza authorized use of force to arrest other strike participants. After the suppression of Zapata's Morelos Commune, strikes were banned by Carranza entirely.

See also 
 Red Battalions
 Mexican Liberal Party

Further reading

Araiza, Luis. Historia del movimiento obrero mexicano. 2nd. ed. 4 volumes. Mexico City: Ediciones de la Casa Mundial 1975.
Carr, Barry. El movimiento obrero y la política en México, 1910-1929. 2 vols. Mexico City: Era 1976.
Carr, Barry. "The Casa del Obrero Mundial, Constitutionalism and the Pact of February 1915." In El Trabajo y los trabajadores en la historia de México edited by Elsa Frost. Mexico City: Colegio de México and Tucson: University of Arizona Press 1979.
Hart, John Mason. Anarchism and the Mexican Working Class, 1860-1931. Austin: University of  Texas Press 1978.
Hart, John Mason. "The Urban Working Class and the Mexican Revolution: The Case of the Casa del Obrero Mundial." Hispanic American Historical Review vol. 58 (1978).
Lear, John. "Casa del Obrero Mundial" in Encyclopedia of Mexico, vol. 1. pp. 206–209. Chicago: Fitzroy Dearborn 1997.
Lear, John. Picturing the Proletariat: Arists and Labor in Revolutionary Mexico, 1908-1940. Austin: University of Texas Press 2017.

References 
This article was adapted from the equivalent Spanish-language Wikipedia article on June 28, 2013.

External links 
 Los centros urbanos y la aparición del anarcosindicalismo en México
 Casa del Obrero Mundial, José Estévez y Ramón Gil
 Casa del Obrero Mundial, Bicentenario.
 Revolutionary Syndicalism in Mexico, John Hart.

1912 in Mexico
Libertarian socialist organizations
Anarchism in Mexico
Anarcho-syndicalism
1912 establishments in Mexico
1917 disestablishments